Mariebergsbron (Swedish: "The Marieberg Bridge") is a bridge in central Stockholm, Sweden. Formerly known as Lilla Essingebron, it connects the islands Kungsholmen to Lilla Essingen. The current name is due to the vicinity to the city district Marieberg.

The first bridge at this location, replacing a hand-pulled ferry, was built in 1907 and financed by local landowners. It was a rather heavy concrete bridge with a five metres wide roadway flanked by two 0,5 metres thick edges.

The bridge was transferred over to the city in 1916, and as Lilla Essingen was being exploited in the 1930s, the bridge was replaced by the current steel bridge with trussed girders. It is 109 meters long; offers a horizontal clearance of 12 metres; is 15 metres wide with a roadway of 10 metres.

See also 
 List of bridges in Stockholm
 Essingebron
 Fredhällsbron (part of the Essingeleden motorway)
 Gamla Essingebroväg

References

External links 
 Stockholmskällan - a photo from 1928 of Lilla Essingebron.

Bridges in Stockholm